This Place is a Canadian drama film, directed by V. T. Nayani and released in 2022. The film stars Devery Jacobs and Priya Guns as Kawenniióhstha and Malai, two young queer women who fall in love while both confronting family difficulties: Kawenniióhstha is searching for her estranged Iranian father, while Malai's father is seriously ill.

The cast also includes Janïsa Weekes, Alex Joseph, Brittany LeBorgne, Ali Momen, Muraly Srinarayanathas, Jahmal Padmore, Golshan Abdmoulaie, Abi Jeyaratnam, Mecha Clarke, Feaven Abera, Ali Badshah, and Darianne Breault.

The film had its world premiere in the Discovery section at the 2022 Toronto International Film Festival on September 9, 2022.

Cast
 Devery Jacobs as Kawenniióhstha Cross
 Priya Guns as Malai Jeyapillai
 Brittany LeBorgne as Wari Cross
 Ali Momen as Behrooz Asadi
 Alex Joseph as Ahrun Jeyapillai
 Janisa Weekes as Dr. Helen Campbell
 Muraly Srinarayanathas as Jeyapillai Chinniah
 Jahmal Padmore as Dwayne Francis
 Darianne Breault as Donna Asadi

Critical response
Courtney Small of That Shelf wrote that "The notion of learning to forgive adds a fascinating layer to Nayani’s film. It allows the film to work as both an engaging romance, and a profound exploration of the intersection of family, community, and identity. Just as Kawenniióhstha and Malai are figuring out who they are both as individuals and a couple, they are also coming to terms with the difficult decisions their families were forced to make."

Drew Gregory of Autostraddle wrote: "All of these threads of story are balanced deftly, always grounded in the people, the cultures, the places, and the time periods on display."

Tomas Trussow of The Lonely Critic wrote: "The battle to preserve connections of all kinds becomes the shaping tenet of Nayani’s work, which is engrained in all facets of the film’s makeup ... allowing viewers to see how fully and freely these characters live out their roots in the moment."

References

External links 
 

2022 films
2022 drama films
2022 LGBT-related films
Canadian drama films
Canadian LGBT-related films
Films shot in Ontario
English-language Canadian films
LGBT-related drama films
First Nations films
Films about Iranian Canadians
Canadian Film Centre films
2022 directorial debut films
2020s Canadian films
LGBT First Nations culture